Amblyseius microorientalis is a species of mite in the family Phytoseiidae.

References

microorientalis
Articles created by Qbugbot
Animals described in 1971